The Grand Center Arts District is located in the Midtown St. Louis Historic District (on the National Register of Historic Places) north of the Saint Louis University campus. Referred to colloquially as Grand Center, the neighborhood's formal name is Covenant Blu Grand Center. The neighborhood's is a member of the Global Cultural Districts Network.

Grand Center is the site of numerous arts and entertainment venues including the Fox Theatre, Powell Symphony Hall (home of the St. Louis Symphony Orchestra), the Contemporary Art Museum Saint Louis, the Pulitzer Arts Foundation, the Sheldon Concert Hall, Clyde C. Miller Career Academy, and Jazz St. Louis.

The neighborhood is an eclectic mix of restored historic structures and newer buildings with street art and neon signage centered on Strauss Park at the intersection of Grand Boulevard and Washington Ave. It includes Third Baptist Church, the St. Louis Black Repertory Theatre Company,  the Grand Center Arts Academy,  KDHX Community Media, St. Louis Public Radio (KWMU), the Kranzberg Arts Center, and the headquarters of the Nine Network of Public Media (KETC), a PBS affiliate. It is near the Grand MetroLink station.

Gallery

Demographics

In 2020 Grand Center's population was 53.1% Black, 31.1% White, 8.7% Asian, 4.4% Two or More Races, and 2.6% Some Other Race. 5.2% of the population was of Hispanic or Latino origin.

Further reading

Articles
"Grand Center Stars As Premier Entertainment District," St. Louis Front Page, 2006. (Online article providing recent description of Grand Center.)

See also
 Midtown St. Louis
 Grand Boulevard (St. Louis)
 Neighborhoods of St. Louis
 Kranzberg Arts Foundation
 Cortex Innovation Community

References

External links
Grand Center Arts District's official website
District info from St. Louis Front Page
Third Baptist Church website
Pulitzer Arts Foundation website
Contemporary Art Museum St. Louis website
The Sheldon Concert Hall and Art Galleries website
KETC, PBS, The Nine Network website
Dance St. Louis website
The Portfolio Art Gallery website
Jazz St. Louis at the Bistro website
International Photography Hall of Fame and Museum website

Neighborhoods in St. Louis
Arts districts
Entertainment districts in the United States
Midtown St. Louis